In cryptography, RC4 (Rivest Cipher 4, also known as ARC4 or ARCFOUR, meaning Alleged RC4, see below) is a stream cipher. While it is remarkable for its simplicity and speed in software, multiple vulnerabilities have been discovered in RC4, rendering it insecure. It is especially vulnerable when the beginning of the output keystream is not discarded, or when nonrandom or related keys are used. Particularly problematic uses of RC4 have led to very insecure protocols such as WEP.

, there is speculation that some state cryptologic agencies may possess the capability to break RC4 when used in the TLS protocol. IETF has published RFC 7465 to prohibit the use of RC4 in TLS; Mozilla and Microsoft have issued similar recommendations.

A number of attempts have been made to strengthen RC4, notably Spritz, RC4A, VMPC, and RC4+.

History
RC4 was designed by Ron Rivest of RSA Security in 1987. While it is officially termed "Rivest Cipher 4", the RC acronym is alternatively understood to stand for "Ron's Code" (see also RC2, RC5 and RC6).

RC4 was initially a trade secret, but in September 1994, a description of it was anonymously posted to the Cypherpunks mailing list. It was soon posted on the sci.crypt newsgroup, where it was broken within days by Bob Jenkins. From there, it spread to many sites on the Internet. The leaked code was confirmed to be genuine, as its output was found to match that of proprietary software using licensed RC4. Because the algorithm is known, it is no longer a trade secret. The name RC4 is trademarked, so RC4 is often referred to as ARCFOUR or ARC4 (meaning alleged RC4) to avoid trademark problems. RSA Security has never officially released the algorithm; Rivest has, however, linked to the English Wikipedia article on RC4 in his own course notes in 2008 and confirmed the history of RC4 and its code in a 2014 paper by him.

RC4 became part of some commonly used encryption protocols and standards, such as WEP in 1997 and WPA in 2003/2004 for wireless cards; and SSL in 1995 and its successor TLS in 1999, until it was prohibited for all versions of TLS by RFC 7465 in 2015, due to the RC4 attacks weakening or breaking RC4 used in SSL/TLS. The main factors in RC4's success over such a wide range of applications have been its speed and simplicity: efficient implementations in both software and hardware were very easy to develop.

Description
RC4 generates a pseudorandom stream of bits (a keystream). As with any stream cipher, these can be used for encryption by combining it with the plaintext using bitwise exclusive or; decryption is performed the same way (since exclusive or with given data is an involution). This is similar to the one-time pad, except that generated pseudorandom bits, rather than a prepared stream, are used. 

To generate the keystream, the cipher makes use of a secret internal state which consists of two parts:
 A permutation of all 256 possible bytes (denoted "S" below).
 Two 8-bit index-pointers (denoted "i" and "j").
The permutation is initialized with a variable-length key, typically between 40 and 2048 bits, using the key-scheduling algorithm (KSA). Once this has been completed, the stream of bits is generated using the pseudo-random generation algorithm (PRGA).

Key-scheduling algorithm (KSA)
The key-scheduling algorithm is used to initialize the permutation in the array "S". "keylength" is defined as the number of bytes in the key and can be in the range 1 ≤ keylength ≤ 256, typically between 5 and 16, corresponding to a key length of 40–128 bits. First, the array "S" is initialized to the identity permutation. S is then processed for 256 iterations in a similar way to the main PRGA, but also mixes in bytes of the key at the same time.

 for i from 0 to 255
     S[i] := i
 endfor
 j := 0
 for i from 0 to 255
     j := (j + S[i] + key[i mod keylength]) mod 256
     swap values of S[i] and S[j]
 endfor

Pseudo-random generation algorithm (PRGA)

For as many iterations as are needed, the PRGA modifies the state and outputs a byte of the keystream. In each iteration, the PRGA: 
 increments ;
 then bitwise exclusive ORed (XORed) with the next byte of the message to produce the next byte of either ciphertext or plaintext.

Each element of S is swapped with another element at least once every 256 iterations.

 i := 0
 j := 0
 while GeneratingOutput:
     i := (i + 1) mod 256
     j := (j + S[i]) mod 256
     swap values of S[i] and S[j]
     K := S[(S[i] + S[j]) mod 256]
     output K
 endwhile

So .

RC4-based random number generators
Several operating systems include , an API originating in OpenBSD providing access to a random number generator originally based on RC4. In OpenBSD 5.5, released in May 2014,  was modified to use ChaCha20. The implementations of arc4random in FreeBSD, NetBSD and Linux's libbsd also use ChaCha20. According to manual pages shipped with the operating system, in the 2017 release of macOS and iOS operating systems, Apple replaced RC4 with AES in its implementation of arc4random. Man pages for the new arc4random include the backronym "A Replacement Call for Random" for ARC4 as a mnemonic, as it provides better random data than rand() does.

Proposed new random number generators are often compared to the RC4 random number generator.

Several attacks on RC4 are able to distinguish its output from a random sequence.

Implementation
Many stream ciphers are based on linear-feedback shift registers (LFSRs), which, while efficient in hardware, are less so in software. The design of RC4 avoids the use of LFSRs and is ideal for software implementation, as it requires only byte manipulations. It uses 256 bytes of memory for the state array, S[0] through S[255], k bytes of memory for the key, key[0] through key[k−1], and integer variables, i, j, and K. Performing a modular reduction of some value modulo 256 can be done with a bitwise AND with 255 (which is equivalent to taking the low-order byte of the value in question).

Test vectors
These test vectors are not official, but convenient for anyone testing their own RC4 program. The keys and plaintext are ASCII, the keystream and ciphertext are in hexadecimal.

Security
Unlike a modern stream cipher (such as those in eSTREAM), RC4 does not take a separate nonce alongside the key.  This means that if a single long-term key is to be used to securely encrypt multiple streams, the protocol must specify how to combine the nonce and the long-term key to generate the stream key for RC4.  One approach to addressing this is to generate a "fresh" RC4 key by hashing a long-term key with a nonce. However, many applications that use RC4 simply concatenate key and nonce; RC4's weak key schedule then gives rise to related-key attacks, like the Fluhrer, Mantin and Shamir attack (which is famous for breaking the WEP standard).

Because RC4 is a stream cipher, it is more malleable than common block ciphers. If not used together with a strong message authentication code (MAC), then encryption is vulnerable to a bit-flipping attack. The cipher is also vulnerable to a stream cipher attack if not implemented correctly.

It is noteworthy, however, that RC4, being a stream cipher, was for a period of time the only common cipher that was immune to the 2011 BEAST attack on TLS 1.0. The attack exploits a known weakness in the way cipher-block chaining mode is used with all of the other ciphers supported by TLS 1.0, which are all block ciphers.

In March 2013, there were new attack scenarios proposed by Isobe, Ohigashi, Watanabe and Morii, as well as AlFardan, Bernstein, Paterson, Poettering and Schuldt that use new statistical biases in RC4 key table to recover plaintext with large number of TLS encryptions.

The use of RC4 in TLS is prohibited by RFC 7465 published in February 2015.

Roos' biases and key reconstruction from permutation
In 1995, Andrew Roos experimentally observed that the first byte of the keystream is correlated with the first three bytes of the key, and the first few bytes of the permutation after the KSA are correlated with some linear combination of the key bytes. These biases remained unexplained until 2007, when Goutam Paul, Siddheshwar Rathi and Subhamoy Maitra proved the keystream–key correlation and, in another work, Goutam Paul and Subhamoy Maitra proved the permutation–key correlations. The latter work also used the permutation–key correlations to design the first algorithm for complete key reconstruction from the final permutation after the KSA, without any assumption on the key or initialization vector. This algorithm has a constant probability of success in a time, which is the square root of the exhaustive key search complexity. Subsequently, many other works have been performed on key reconstruction from RC4 internal states. These types of biases are used in some of the later key reconstruction methods for increasing the success probability.

Biased outputs of the RC4
The keystream generated by the RC4 is biased to varying degrees towards certain sequences, making it vulnerable to distinguishing attacks. The best such attack is due to Itsik Mantin and Adi Shamir, who showed that the second output byte of the cipher was biased toward zero with probability 1/128 (instead of 1/256). This is due to the fact that if the third byte of the original state is zero, and the second byte is not equal to 2, then the second output byte is always zero. Such bias can be detected by observing only 256 bytes.

Souradyuti Paul and Bart Preneel of COSIC showed that the first and the second bytes of the RC4 were also biased. The number of required samples to detect this bias is 225 bytes.

Scott Fluhrer and David McGrew also showed attacks that distinguished the keystream of the RC4 from a random stream given a gigabyte of output.

The complete characterization of a single step of RC4 PRGA was performed by Riddhipratim Basu, Shirshendu Ganguly, Subhamoy Maitra, and Goutam Paul. Considering all the permutations, they proved that the distribution of the output is not uniform given i and j, and as a consequence, information about j is always leaked into the output.

Fluhrer, Mantin and Shamir attack

In 2001, a new and surprising discovery was made by Fluhrer, Mantin and Shamir: over all the possible RC4 keys, the statistics for the first few bytes of output keystream are strongly non-random, leaking information about the key. If the nonce and long-term key are simply concatenated to generate the RC4 key, this long-term key can be discovered by analysing a large number of messages encrypted with this key. This and related effects were then used to break the WEP ("wired equivalent privacy") encryption used with 802.11 wireless networks. This caused a scramble for a standards-based replacement for WEP in the 802.11 market and led to the IEEE 802.11i effort and WPA.

Protocols can defend against this attack by discarding the initial portion of the keystream. Such a modified algorithm is traditionally called "RC4-drop[]", where  is the number of initial keystream bytes that are dropped. The SCAN default is  = 768 bytes, but a conservative value would be  = 3072 bytes.

The Fluhrer, Mantin and Shamir attack does not apply to RC4-based SSL, since SSL generates the encryption keys it uses for RC4 by hashing, meaning that different SSL sessions have unrelated keys.

Klein's attack
In 2005, Andreas Klein presented an analysis of the RC4 stream cipher, showing more correlations between the RC4 keystream and the key. Erik Tews, Ralf-Philipp Weinmann, and Andrei Pychkine used this analysis to create aircrack-ptw, a tool that cracks 104-bit RC4 used in 128-bit WEP in under a minute. Whereas the Fluhrer, Mantin, and Shamir attack used around 10 million messages, aircrack-ptw can break 104-bit keys in 40,000 frames with 50% probability, or in 85,000 frames with 95% probability.

Combinatorial problem
A combinatorial problem related to the number of inputs and outputs of the RC4 cipher was first posed by Itsik Mantin and Adi Shamir in 2001, whereby, of the total 256 elements in the typical state of RC4, if x number of elements (x ≤ 256) are only known (all other elements can be assumed empty), then the maximum number of elements that can be produced deterministically is also  in the next 256 rounds. This conjecture was put to rest in 2004 with a formal proof given by Souradyuti Paul and Bart Preneel.

Royal Holloway attack
In 2013, a group of security researchers at the Information Security Group at Royal Holloway, University of London reported an attack that can become effective using only 234 encrypted messages. While yet not a practical attack for most purposes, this result is sufficiently close to one that it has led to speculation that it is plausible that some state cryptologic agencies may already have better attacks that render RC4 insecure. Given that, a large amount of TLS traffic uses RC4 to avoid attacks on block ciphers that use cipher block chaining, if these hypothetical better attacks exist, then this would make the TLS-with-RC4 combination insecure against such attackers in a large number of practical scenarios.

In March 2015, researcher to Royal Holloway announced improvements to their attack, providing a 226 attack against passwords encrypted with RC4, as used in TLS.

Bar mitzvah attack

At the Black Hat Asia 2015 Conference, Itsik Mantin presented another attack against SSL using RC4 cipher.

NOMORE attack
In 2015, security researchers from KU Leuven presented new attacks against RC4 in both TLS and WPA-TKIP. Dubbed the Numerous Occurrence MOnitoring & Recovery Exploit (NOMORE) attack, it is the first attack of its kind that was demonstrated in practice. Their attack against TLS can decrypt a secure HTTP cookie within 75 hours. The attack against WPA-TKIP can be completed within an hour and allows an attacker to decrypt and inject arbitrary packets.

RC4 variants
As mentioned above, the most important weakness of RC4 comes from the insufficient key schedule; the first bytes of output reveal information about the key.  This can be corrected by simply discarding some initial portion of the output stream. This is known as RC4-dropN, where N is typically a multiple of 256, such as 768 or 1024.

A number of attempts have been made to strengthen RC4, notably Spritz, RC4A, VMPC, and RC4+.

RC4A
Souradyuti Paul and Bart Preneel have proposed an RC4 variant, which they call RC4A.

Each time  is incremented, two bytes are generated:

Thus, the algorithm is:

 All arithmetic is performed modulo 256
 i := 0
 j1 := 0
 j2 := 0
 while GeneratingOutput:
     i := i + 1
     j1 := j1 + S1[i]
     swap values of S1[i] and S1[j1]
     output S2[S1[i] + S1[j1]]
     j2 := j2 + S2[i]
     swap values of S2[i] and S2[j2]
     output S1[S2[i] + S2[j2]]
 endwhile

Although the algorithm required the same number of operations per output byte, there is greater parallelism than RC4, providing a possible speed improvement.

Although stronger than RC4, this algorithm has also been attacked, with Alexander Maximov and a team from NEC developing ways to distinguish its output from a truly random sequence.

VMPC

Variably Modified Permutation Composition (VMPC) is another RC4 variant. It uses similar key schedule as RC4, with
 iterating 3 × 256 = 768 times rather than 256, and with an optional additional 768 iterations to incorporate an initial vector. The output generation function operates as follows:

 All arithmetic is performed modulo 256.
 i := 0
 while GeneratingOutput:
     a := S[i]
     j := S[j + a]
     
     output S[S[S[j] + 1]]
     Swap S[i] and S[j]          (b := S[j]; S[i] := b; S[j] := a))
     
     i := i + 1
 endwhile

This was attacked in the same papers as RC4A, and can be distinguished within 238 output bytes.

RC4+
RC4+ is a modified version of RC4 with a more complex three-phase key schedule (taking about three times as long as RC4, or the same as RC4-drop512), and a more complex output function which performs four additional lookups in the S array for each byte output, taking approximately 1.7 times as long as basic RC4.

 All arithmetic modulo 256.  << and >> are left and right shift, ⊕ is exclusive OR
 while GeneratingOutput:
     i := i + 1
     a := S[i]
     j := j + a
     
     Swap S[i] and S[j]               (b := S[j]; S[j] := S[i]; S[i] := b;)
     
     c := S[i<<5 ⊕ j>>3] + S[j<<5 ⊕ i>>3]
     output (S[a+b] + S[c⊕0xAA]) ⊕ S[j+b]
 endwhile

This algorithm has not been analyzed significantly.

Spritz

In 2014, Ronald Rivest gave a talk and co-wrote a paper on an updated redesign called Spritz. A hardware accelerator of Spritz was published in Secrypt, 2016 and shows that due to multiple nested calls required to produce output bytes, Spritz performs rather slowly compared to other hash functions such as SHA-3 and the best known hardware implementation of RC4.

The algorithm is:
 All arithmetic is performed modulo 256
 while GeneratingOutput:
     i := i + w
     j := k + S[j + S[i]]
     k := k + i + S[j]
     swap values of S[i] and S[j]
     output z := S[j + S[i + S[z + k]]]
 endwhile

The value , is relatively prime to the size of the S array. So after 256 iterations of this inner loop, the value  (incremented by  every iteration) has taken on all possible values 0...255, and every byte in the S array has been swapped at least once.

Like other sponge functions, Spritz can be used to build a cryptographic hash function, a deterministic random bit generator (DRBG), an encryption algorithm that supports authenticated encryption with associated data (AEAD), etc.

In 2016, Banik and Isobe proposed an attack that can distinguish Spritz from random noise.

RC4-based protocols
 WEP
 TKIP (default algorithm for WPA, but can be configured to use AES-CCMP instead of RC4)
 BitTorrent protocol encryption
 Microsoft Office XP (insecure implementation since nonce remains unchanged when documents get modified)
 Microsoft Point-to-Point Encryption
 Transport Layer Security / Secure Sockets Layer (was optional and then the use of RC4 was prohibited in RFC 7465)
 Secure Shell (optionally)
 Remote Desktop Protocol (optionally)
 Kerberos (optionally)
 SASL Mechanism Digest-MD5 (optionally, historic, obsoleted in RFC 6331)
 Gpcode.AK, an early June 2008 computer virus for Microsoft Windows, which takes documents hostage for ransom by obscuring them with RC4 and RSA-1024 encryption
 PDF
 Skype (in modified form)

Where a protocol is marked with "(optionally)", RC4 is one of multiple ciphers the system can be configured to use.

See also
 TEA, Block TEA also known as eXtended TEA and Corrected Block TEA – A family of block ciphers that, like RC4, are designed to be very simple to implement.
 Advanced Encryption Standard
 CipherSaber

References

Further reading

External links
 Original posting of RC4 algorithm to Cypherpunks mailing list, Archived version
  – Improved Arcfour Modes for the Secure Shell (SSH) Transport Layer Protocol
  – Test Vectors for the Stream Cipher RC4
  – Prohibiting RC4 Cipher Suites
 
 SCAN's entry for RC4
 
 RSA Security Response to Weaknesses in Key Scheduling Algorithm of RC4

RC4 in WEP
 (in)Security of the WEP algorithm
 

Stream ciphers
Broken stream ciphers
Pseudorandom number generators
Free ciphers
Articles with example C code